The 1987 NCAA Division I-AA football season, part of college football in the United States organized by the National Collegiate Athletic Association at the Division I-AA level, began in August 1987, and concluded with the 1987 NCAA Division I-AA Football Championship Game on December 19, 1987, at the Minidome in Pocatello, Idaho. The Northeast Louisiana Indians won their first I-AA championship, defeating the Marshall Thundering Herd by a score of 43–42.

Conference changes and new programs
The Gulf Star Conference folded after the 1986 season when four of its founding members, Northwestern State, Sam Houston State, Southwest Texas State, and Stephen F. Austin, joined the Southland Conference. The Gulf Star's remaining football member, Nicholls State, opted to become an Independent.  Three former Southland Conference members, Arkansas State, Lamar, and Louisiana Tech, moved to D-IAA Independent status following their joining the newly formed, non-football, American South Conference as charter members.

Conference standings

Conference champions

Postseason
The playoff bracket of sixteen teams had four seeded teams; Appalachian State, Northeast Louisiana, Northern Iowa, and Idaho were first through fourth, respectively. Undefeated and top-ranked Holy Cross, featuring Heisman Trophy candidate Gordie Lockbaum, did not participate in the postseason, per the rules of their conference, the Colonial League (known as the Patriot League since 1990).

The Mid-Eastern Athletic Conference (MEAC) conference champion Howard Bison (9–1) did not receive an invitation to the I-AA playoffs and filed a lawsuit against the NCAA and sought a temporary restraining order to delay the start of the playoffs. The lawsuit asserted "unlawful and racially motivated reasons" for the team being passed over. Two days later, the request for a temporary restraining order was rejected by federal judge John Garrett Penn. Howard then advocated that they, plus three other teams, should be added to the second round of the playoffs; the proposal was rejected by the NCAA, who said that Howard had played a weak schedule. In September 1989, MEAC stripped Howard of their 1987 conference championship, retroactively awarding it to Delaware State, after finding that Howard had used some players beyond their four years of NCAA eligibility.

The I-AA playoff field remained at sixteen through the 2009 season, expanding to twenty in 2010 and 24 in 2013.

NCAA Division I-AA playoff bracket

* Next to team name denotes host institution

* Next to score denotes overtime periods

References